Gymnoscelis spodias is a moth in the family Geometridae. It was described by Alfred Jefferis Turner in 1922. It is found in Australia (Queensland).

References

Moths described in 1922
spodias